The L&YR Class 31 was a class of 0-8-0 steam locomotives of the Lancashire and Yorkshire Railway. The class was designed by George Hughes and introduced in 1912. The class comprised 115 new locomotives and 40 rebuilt from other classes.

Transfer to LMS
The locomotives passed to the London, Midland and Scottish Railway (LMS) in 1923. The LMS numbered them 12840-12994 and gave them the power classification 7F.

Transfer to BR
In 1948, British Railways (BR) inherited 17 locomotives and numbered them in the range 52841–52971.

Withdrawal
No examples of this class were preserved.

References

0-8-0 locomotives
31
Railway locomotives introduced in 1912
D h2 locomotives
Scrapped locomotives